Chondrus is a genus of gastropods belonging to the family Enidae.

The species of this genus are found in Mediterranean.

Species:

Chondrus lycaonicus 
Chondrus pusanovi 
Chondrus tournefortianus 
Chondrus zebrulus 
Chondrus zebrulus

References

Enidae